Lecanographa amylacea is a species of lichen belonging to the family Roccellaceae.

It is native to Europe and Northern America.

References

Arthoniomycetes
Lichen species
Lichens described in 1794
Taxa named by Christiaan Hendrik Persoon
Lichens of Europe
Lichens of North America